The 2020–21 Women's EHF Champions League group stage began on 12 September 2020 and concluded on 14 February 2021. On 10 February 2021, after a decision by the EHF Executive Committee, it was announced that all 16 teams would advance to the knockout stage. The matches which could not be played were assessed.

Draw
The draw was held on 1 July 2020 in Vienna, Austria.

Seeding
The composition of the seeding pots for the group stage draw was announced on 22 June 2020. From each pot, two teams were drawn into Group A and the other two in Group B. Teams from the same national association were not drawn into the same group.

Format
In each group, teams played against each other in a double round-robin format, with home and away matches.

Tiebreakers
In the group stage, teams are ranked according to points (2 points for a win, 1 point for a draw, 0 points for a loss). After completion of the group stage, if two or more teams have the same number of points, the ranking is determined as follows:

Highest number of points in matches between the teams directly involved;
Superior goal difference in matches between the teams directly involved;
Highest number of goals scored in matches between the teams directly involved (or in the away match in case of a two-team tie);
Superior goal difference in all matches of the group;
Highest number of plus goals in all matches of the group;
If the ranking of one of these teams is determined, the above criteria are consecutively followed until the ranking of all teams is determined. If no ranking can be determined, a decision shall be obtained by EHF through drawing of lots.

Groups
The matchdays were 12–13 September, 19–20 September, 26–27 September, 10–11 October, 17–18 October, 24–25 October, 7–8 November, 14–15 November, 21–22 November 2020, 9–10 January, 16–17 January, 23–24 January, 6–7 February, 13–14 February 2021.

Times until 25 October 2020 are UTC+2, from 26 October 2020 on times are UTC+1.

Due to the COVID-19 pandemic, each local health department allows a different number of spectators.

All matches ending with a 10–0 results were assessed by the EHF.

Group A

Group B

Notes

References

External links
Official website 

Group stage